Shahdadkot is the most populated and largest Tehsil of Qambar Shahdadkot District of Sindh, Pakistan. It was named after the town founder Shahdad Khan Khuhawar. It is located around 51 kilometres northwest of Larkana and 34 kilometers north of Qambar. The town is in close proximity to three districts of Balochistan namely Khuzdar, Jhal Magsi and Jaffarabad in the west and north of the district. It is linked on the M8 motorway route between Gwadar and Ratodero.

Town is also a political stronghold of Pakistan People's Party since 1970. The town was also the constituency of the former prime minister of Pakistan, Benazir Bhutto. PPP MPA Nadir Khan Magsi has been elected for more than 3 decades now.

Health challenges

Contaminated water 
The underground water in the Shahdadkot was found to be contaminated with harmful chemicals and heavy metals that made it unfit for human consumption. Officials from the Sindh Environmental Protection Agency who have confirmed the contamination. The government is providing bottled water as a temporary solution, but long-term measures are needed to address the issue.

HIV outbreak 
There was a significant increase in child HIV cases in the Sindh province of Pakistan in recent years. Officials from the Sindh AIDS Control Program identified poverty, malnutrition, and lack of access to healthcare as some of the factors contributing to the rise in cases. The government responded by providing free HIV testing and treatment to affected children.

Flood destruction 
In August 2022, Heavy monsoon rains caused flooding in several areas of Pakistan, including Shahdadkot and other small cities in Sindh and Punjab. Heavy rains caused the Meeru Khan Canal in Qamber-Shahdadkot district to overflow and breach its embankments, resulting in flooding in several nearby villages. The floods damaged homes, crops, and livestock, and disrupted communications and transportation. An inquiry was launched to determine the cause and prevent similar incidents.

Local authorities and rescue teams provided relief and evacuated affected communities, but faced challenges due to the scale of the disaster. Deputy Commissioner Javed Nabi Khoso distributed food items among people affected by floods in the Katcha area of Qubo Saeed Khan. The distribution was carried out on behalf of the Provincial Disaster Management Authority.   

Floods caused significant damage to property and infrastructure and affected millions of people. The government made efforts to rescue those affected, but many are still waiting for relief.

Sports 
Cricket is the main sports played by the majority of the citizens besides that Football is also prevalent when Sindh Balochistan inter provincial tournaments are held.

There is one official Cricket stadium where Cricket tournaments are held over the course of one year and many local clubs compete in such tournaments.

Volleyball can be seen played mostly in country sides in the evenings. Soccer is also played amongst kids in local schools.

Notable people 
 Mian Ghulam Siddique Mekan, Sufi saint
 Suman Pawan Bodani, first Hindu woman to become a civil judge

See also
 Larkana
 Kachi Pul
 Suman Kumari
 Mian Ghulam Siddique Mekan
 Garhi Khairo

References

External links 
 Weather map of Shahdadkot

Populated places in Qambar Shahdadkot District